Llaneras de Toa Baja is the professional female volleyball team of Toa Baja, Puerto Rico.

Squads

Previous

Current
As of April 2011
 Head Coach:  Juan Carlos Núñez
 Assistant coach:  Gabriel Rodríguez

Release or Transfer

Palmares

League Championship
1999, 2009

References

External links
 League Official website
 Team website

Puerto Rican volleyball clubs
Volleyball clubs established in 1994